The 1967 Season was the 8th season for the San Diego Chargers as a professional AFL franchise; the team improved on their 7–6–1 record in 1966 and finishing at 8–5–1. It was the team's first season at San Diego Stadium (now known as Qualcomm Stadium), and the Chargers finished in third place in the AFL West Division with a record of 8–5–1.

In August 1967, the San Diego Chargers played their first game at the new football stadium.  The city named it the San Diego Stadium.

Roster

Season schedule
>(*) Played at San Diego Stadium due to the Fenway Park, Patriot's home field, used by stadium's owner, Boston Red Sox, for the 1967 World Series.

Game summaries

Week 14

Standings

San Diego Chargers
San Diego Chargers seasons
San Diego Chargers f